The flag of La Guajira was officially adopted by the Departmental Assembly by means of Ordinance 028 of September 29, 1966. Previously, the flag had already been in use as the flag of the Intendancy of La Guajira, and subsequently it was modified last by Ordinance 052 of 1994.

The Gubernatorial Standard is based on the Flag of the Department but it is charged at the centre with the Coat of arms of the Department of La Guajira.

Design

See also
 Coat of arms of the Department of La Guajira

References

2. 

Flags of the departments of Colombia
Flag
Flags introduced in 1966